Adamescu is a Romanian surname. Notable people with the surname include:

Dan Adamescu (1948–2017), Romanian businessman, founder of The Nova Group
Alexander Adamescu, son of Dan
Gheorghe Adamescu (1869–1942), Romanian literary historian and bibliographer

Romanian-language surnames
Surnames from given names